The Changeling is an upcoming horror fantasy television series based on the novel of the same name by Victor LaValle. It will be written by Kelly Marcel and directed by Melina Matsoukas.

Premise
A man goes in search of his wife after she does something horrific in the aftermath of the birth of their first child.

Cast

Main
LaKeith Stanfield as Apollo Kagwa, a used book dealer.
Adina Porter as Lillian Kagwa, Apollo's mother.
Alexis Louder as young Lillian Kagwa.
Clark Backo as Emma "Emmy" Valentine, Apollo's pregnant wife.
Samuel T. Herring as William Wheeler, a man who befriends Apollo in a quest to win back his wife and children.

Recurring
Amirah Vann as Kim Valentine, Emma's sister and sole family member.
Malcolm Barrett as Patrice Green, Apollo’s best friend, ex-veteran and fellow book enthusiast.
Jared Abrahamson as Brian West, a parole officer, Apollo's father and Lillian’s husband.

Production
Annapurna Pictures acquired the rights to the novel in August 2017, with the intention to turn it into a television series. In August 2021, Apple TV+ greenlit the series, with Kelly Marcel writing the series and serving as showrunner, Melina Matsoukas directing and Lakeith Stanfield cast to star. Adina Porter and Clark Backo were added to the cast in March 2022. In June, musician Samuel T. Herring joined the cast. Malcolm Barrett, Alexis Louder, Amirah Vann and Jared Abrahamson would be cast in recurring roles in July.

Filming on the series began by May 2022 in New Jersey under the working title Improbable Valentine, and is expected to conclude in the fall. Filming locations include Hoboken, Jersey City, New York City, as well as the Canadian cities Toronto and London.

References

External links
The Changeling at the Internet Movie Database

2020s American drama television series
Apple TV+ original programming
English-language television shows
Television shows based on American novels
Television shows filmed in London, Ontario
Television shows filmed in New Jersey
Television shows filmed in New York City
Television shows filmed in Toronto
Upcoming drama television series